Tiger Stadium is a 7,000-capacity stadium located in Livingston, Alabama. It is home to the University of West Alabama West Alabama Tigers football team.

The stadium was built in 1952 to fill the need for an on-campus stadium - until 1952 the Tigers played home games at Livingston High School. It is built on a patch of land known as Crawdad Creek.

External links
 UWA - Tiger Stadium

West Alabama Tigers football
American football venues in Alabama
College football venues
Buildings and structures in Sumter County, Alabama
1952 establishments in Alabama
Sports venues completed in 1952